The Moore Center for Theoretical Cosmology and Physics (CTCP) is a think tank for research into the nature of the universe on cosmological and nanoscales. Their research involves studies "from the beginning of time to the ongoing dynamics of dark matter, galaxies, and stars."

Marc Kamionkowski was one of the founding Directors in 2006. Current director is Mark B. Wise

The Center is physically located inside the Lauritsen and Cahill buildings on the Caltech campus in Pasadena, California.

External links

California Institute of Technology
Physical cosmology
Physics organizations
Science and technology think tanks